Andrzej Viktor "Andrew" Schally (born 30 November 1926) is an American endocrinologist of Polish ancestry, who was a corecipient, with Roger Guillemin and Rosalyn Sussman Yalow, of the Nobel Prize in Physiology or Medicine. This award recognized his research in the discovery that the hypothalamus controls hormone production and release by the pituitary gland, which controls the regulation of other hormones in the body. Later in life Schally utilized his knowledge of hypothalamic hormones to research possible methods for birth control and cancer treatment.

Life and career
Andrzej Wiktor Schally was born in Wilno in the Second Polish Republic (now Vilnius, Lithuania), the son of Brigadier General Kazimierz Schally, who was chief of the cabinet of President Ignacy Mościcki of Poland, and Maria (née Łącka).

In September 1939, when Poland was attacked by Nazi Germany and the Soviet Union, Schally escaped with Poland's President Ignacy Mościcki, the prime minister and the whole cabinet to the neutral Romania, where they were interned .
I was fortunate to survive the holocaust while living among the Jewish-Polish Community in Roumania. I used to speak Polish, Roumanian, Yiddish, Italian and some German and Russian, but I have almost completely forgotten them, and my French in which I used to excel is also now far from fluent.

Immediately after the war, in 1945, he moved via Italy and France to the United Kingdom where he changed his first name to Andrew. Schally received his education in Scotland and England. In 1952, he moved to Canada. He received his doctorate in endocrinology from McGill University in 1957. That same year he left for a research career in the United States where he has worked principally at Tulane University. Schally currently conducts research in endocrinology at the Miami Veteran's Administration Medical Center in Miami, Florida. A Canadian citizen when he left Canada, Schally became a naturalized citizen of the United States in 1962. He was affiliated with the Baylor College of Medicine for some years in Houston, Texas.

He developed a new realm of knowledge concerning the brain's control over the body chemistry. Schally explained in his 1977 Nobel Lecture that he, alongside his researchers, dissected 250,000 pig hypothalami in order to isolate 5 mg of the hormone thyrotropin-releasing hormone (TRH) to determine the molecular structure of the hormone. His work also addressed birth control methods and the effects of growth hormones on the body. Together with Roger Guillemin he described the neurohormone gonadotropin-releasing hormone (GnRH) that controls follicle-stimulating hormone (FSH) and luteinizing hormone (LH), two hormones that are integral parts of reproduction and growth and development.

Schally received an honoris causa doctors degree from the Jagiellonian University in Kraków.

Recognized as a Fellow of the Kosciuszko Foundation of Eminent Scientists of Polish Origin and Ancestry.

He was married to Margaret Rachel White (divorced), and Ana Maria de Medeiros-Comaru.

Cancer research 
In 1981 it was demonstrated that the gonadotropin-releasing hormone (GnRH) agonistic analogs that Schally had developed between the years of 1972-1978 inhibited the growth of prostate cancer in rats. Alongside Dr. George Tolis, Schally conducted the first clinical trial of GnRH for patients with advanced prostate cancer in 1982. This method is now the preferred treatment for advanced prostate carcinoma. About 70% of patients with prostate cancer receive an agonist as their primary method of treatment. According to Schally, his treatment causes fewer side effects than radiation and chemotherapy. The previous method of treatment, orchiectomy or the administration of estrogens, was based on the research of Charles Brenton Huggins.

In 2004, after the death of his wife due to thyroid cancer, Schally found comfort in continuing his research.

Awards and honors
 Van Meter Award of the American Thyroid Association (1969)
Albert Lasker Award (1975)
 Nobel Prize in Physiology or Medicine (1977)
Golden Plate Award of the American Academy of Achievement (1978)

References

Aleksandra Ziółkowska, Korzenie są polskie (The Roots Are Polish), Warsaw, 1992, .
Aleksandra Ziolkowska-Boehm, The Roots Are Polish, Toronto, 2004, .
Nicholas Wade, The Nobel Duel, Garden City, Anchor Press/Doubleday, 1981.

External links 
 

1926 births
Living people
American endocrinologists
American Nobel laureates
Baylor College of Medicine physicians and researchers
McGill University Faculty of Medicine alumni
Members of the United States National Academy of Sciences
Nobel laureates in Physiology or Medicine
People with acquired American citizenship
Polish emigrants to the United States
Recipients of the Albert Lasker Award for Basic Medical Research
Tulane University faculty
Scientists from Vilnius
Baylor College of Medicine faculty